Giuseppe Incorpora (Palermo, 1834-idem, 1914) was an important Italian photographer of 19th century.

References

1834 births
1914 deaths
Photographers from Palermo
19th-century Italian photographers